is a 1984 boxing sports video game developed and published by Sega for the SG-1000, and later ported to  the arcades, only in Japan and Europe. It was Sega-AM2 founder and leader Yu Suzuki's debut creation, as well as that of Rieko Kodama. In 1985, a successor of Champion Boxing titled Champion Pro Wrestling was released in the arcades, and ported to the SG-1000 and the MSX home computer the same year. However, this is a professional wrestling game instead of a boxing game.

Development
Yu Suzuki described Champion Boxing as a minor project with very little staff, and said that because of this it allowed him to learn the process of games development with very little pressure. Because the game was understaffed for designers, Suzuki actually contributed some of the drawings for the various punching animations.

According to Suzuki, the game was developed for the SG-1000 first, and then the arcade version was created by simply installing an SG-1000 in an arcade cabinet.

Pengo makes a cameo after a KO.

References

External links

Champion Boxing at arcade-history

1984 video games
Arcade video games
Boxing video games
MSX games
Sega arcade games
Sega-AM2 games
SG-1000 games
Video games designed by Yu Suzuki
Video games developed in Japan